2nd Tukatovo (Russian: 2-е Тукатово; , 2-se Tükät) is a rural locality (a settlement) in Nukayevsky Selsoviet of Kugarchinsky District, Bashkortostan, Russia. The population was 19 as of 2010.

Geography 
2nd Tukatovo is located 34 km south of Mrakovo (the district's administrative centre) by road. Nukayevo is the nearest rural locality.

Ethnicity 
The village is inhabited by Bashkirs and others.

Streets 
 Tsentralnaya

References

External links 
 2nd Tukatovo on komandirovka.ru

Rural localities in Kugarchinsky District